Paraphidippus aurantius is a species of jumping spider, commonly known as the emerald jumping spider or golden jumping spider. P. aurantius is a solitary hunter, with a fairly large size for a jumping spider. It is green or black with white side stripes on each side of its head and a white border around the top of the abdomen. It also has a midline of hairs down its center with small white dots and lines on either side.

Distribution
Paraphidippus aurantius occurs from the United States to Panama, and on the Greater Antilles.

References

 (2007): The world spider catalog, version 8.0. American Museum of Natural History.

External links

 Emerald Jumping Spider on a table

Salticidae
Spiders of North America
Spiders described in 1833